Nimeh Kareh (also Romanized as Nīmeh Kāreh; also known as Neşfeh Kār and Nīmeh Kār) is a village in Zamkan Rural District, in the Zamkan District of Salas-e Babajani County, Kermanshah Province, Iran. At the 2006 census, its population was 411, in 90 families.

References 

Populated places in Salas-e Babajani County